Legh may refer to:

Families
 Leghs of Adlington, Cheshire family dating back to 1315 who lived in Adlington Hall, a manor house in the Borough of Cheshire East
 Leghs of Lyme, family who owned Lyme Park in Cheshire, England, from 1398 to 1946, when the house and estate were given to the National Trust

People
George Anthony Legh Keck (b. 1784), English politician
Legh Richmond (1772–1827), English clergyman
Thomas Legh Claughton (1808–1892), English academic and clergyman
William Legh Walsh (1857–1938), Canadian lawyer
Thomas Legh (disambiguation)

Other uses
High Legh, a village and civil parish in Cheshire